ABC1 was a television channel owned by the Disney-ABC Television Group division of The Walt Disney Company, available to the viewers in the United Kingdom and the Republic of Ireland. ABC1 used the branding of the Disney-owned American network, ABC.

The channel had general entertainment programming with programming from the US parent channel, apart from the weekend morning programming block Playhouse Disney, which was aimed at children and also aired on Disney Channel in the United States of America.

History
ABC1 channel initially launched exclusively on the British digital terrestrial television platform Freeview on 27 September 2004 but it only broadcast daily from 6am to 6pm with the expectations to eventually broadcast 24/7 by 2010. The channel didn't air commercials for the first few months to build up viewers. In December 2004, it was expanded on Telewest's digital cable service, and on 14 December on the NTL digital cable service.

In March 2005, ABC1 took its first advertisement from Procter and Gamble. Also in 2005, Sky started carrying the channel. In Summer 2006, a Playhouse Disney block was added to the schedule in the morning.

It was announced on 7 September 2007, that ABC1 would close down, due to Disney deciding to concentrate on their other channels and lack of primetime availability on Freeview UK. Despite being scheduled to close down on 1 October 2007, ABC1 stopped broadcasting early on all UK & Republic of Ireland TV platforms at noon on 26 September 2007, a day before its third anniversary. The channel was then replaced by a timeshift service of Playhouse Disney.

Programming

8 Simple Rules
Americas Funniest Home Videos (Seasons 6-8)
Family Matters 
Full House
General Hospital
Ghost Whisperer
George Lopez
Home Improvement
Hope & Faith 
Kevin Hill
Less than Perfect
My Wife & Kids
Moonlighting
Once and Again
Rodney
Sabrina The Teenage Witch
Step By Step
''The Guardian

References

External links
Official site (archived)

2004 establishments in the United Kingdom
2007 disestablishments in the United Kingdom
1 UK
Defunct television channels in the United Kingdom
Disney television channels in the United Kingdom
Television channels and stations established in 2004
Television channels and stations disestablished in 2007
Former subsidiaries of The Walt Disney Company